Antonios Fokaidis (born 29 August 1989) is a Greek swimmer. He participates in the open water events.

He won the silver medal in the Team event at the 2013 World Aquatics Championships in Barcelona alongside his team mates Spyridon Gianniotis and Kalliopi Araouzou. With the same team he had earlier won the gold medal at the 2010 European Open Water Championships in Balatonfüred.

References

Living people
Male long-distance swimmers
Greek male swimmers
1989 births
World Aquatics Championships medalists in open water swimming
Swimmers at the 2013 Mediterranean Games
Mediterranean Games competitors for Greece
20th-century Greek people
21st-century Greek people